WGEL 101.7 FM is a radio station broadcasting a country music format, licensed to Greenville, Illinois. The station is owned by Bond Broadcasting Inc.

References

External links
WGEL's official website

GEL
Bond County, Illinois